The Medina del Campo railway station is a railway station serving the Spanish city of Medina del Campo, in the province of Valladolid.

History 
The original station opened in 1860. The first train from Valladolid opening the Valladolid–Medina stretch of the Madrid–Hendaye railway arrived on 3 September 1860, an event for which the locals had been summoned by means of a municipal ordinance dated from 29 August. It was expanded and a new building was inaugurated in 1902, under a 1896 project devised by Vicente Sala.

Bibliography 
References

Bibliography
 
 

Buildings and structures in the Province of Valladolid
Medina del Campo
Railway stations in Castile and León
Railway stations in Spain opened in 1860